Axiopoeniella laymerisa is a species of moth in the subfamily Arctiinae first described by Alfred Grandidier in 1867. It is found on Madagascar.

References

Moths described in 1867
Arctiinae
Lepidoptera of Madagascar
Moths of Madagascar
Moths of Africa